West Side or Westside may refer to:

Places

Canada
 West Side, a neighbourhood of Windsor, Ontario
 West Side, a neighbourhood of Vancouver, British Columbia

United Kingdom
 West Side, Lewis, Outer Hebrides, Scotland
 Westside, Birmingham England
 Westside, Gibraltar

United States
Alphabetical by state
 Westside, California (disambiguation), several places, including:
 Westside (Los Angeles County)
 Westside, Fresno County, California
 West Long Beach, Long Beach
 Westside, Jacksonville, Florida
 Westside, Georgia
 Westside, Atlanta, Georgia
 West Side, Chicago, Illinois
 Westside (Gary), Indiana
 Westside, Iowa
 Westside, Baltimore, Maryland
 West Side, Wakefield, Massachusetts
 West Springfield, Massachusetts
 West Side, Manchester, New Hampshire
 West Side, Jersey City, New Jersey
 West Side, Newark, New Jersey
 West Side (Manhattan), New York City, New York
 West Side, Binghamton, New York
 Westside, Syracuse, New York
 West Side, Oregon
 West Side (Charleston), West Virginia

Education
 Westside High School (disambiguation), several schools
 Westside Community Schools, Omaha, Nebraska
 West Lafayette Junior-Senior High School, Indiana
 West Seattle High School, Washington

Music
 Westlife, originally Westside, an Irish pop vocal group
 Westside (album), by JJ Lin, 2007
 "Westside" (TQ song), 1998
 "West Side", a song by the Game from Born 2 Rap, 2019
 "The West Side", a song by Phil Collins from Hello, I Must Be Going!, 1982
 "Westside", a song by Ariana Grande from Positions, 2020
 "Westside", a song by Athlete from Vehicles & Animals, 2003
 "Westside", a song by Fetty Wap, 2016
 "Westside", a song by Lil Yachty from Lil Boat 3, 2020
 Westside Records, a record label owned by Demon Music Group

Television
 Westside (New Zealand TV series), a 2015–2020 comedy-drama series
 Westside (2018 TV series), an American music reality series
 Westside, a 2013 American pilot episode written and produced by Byron Balasco
 "Westside" (Southland), a 2009 episode

Other
 West Side Place, an approved skyscraper complex to be built in Melbourne, Australia
 Westside Shopping and Leisure Centre, near Bern, Switzerland
 Trent (Westside), a retail chain in India

See also
 West Side Highway (disambiguation)
 West Side Historic District (disambiguation)
 West Side Line (disambiguation)
 West Side Story (disambiguation)
 Westside Township (disambiguation)